The 1987 Individual Ice Speedway World Championship was the 22nd edition of the World Championship  The Championship was held on 14 and 15 March 1987 in Berlin in Germany.

The winner was Yuri Ivanov of the Soviet Union for the second time.

Classification

See also 
 1987 Individual Speedway World Championship in classic speedway
 1987 Team Ice Racing World Championship

References 

Ice speedway competitions
World